Kursk Oblast is a federal subject of Russia (an oblast). Its administrative center is the city of Kursk. As of the 2021 Census, Kursk Oblast has a population of 1,082,458.

Geography
The surface is hilly and intersected by ravines. The central part of Kursk oblast is more elevated than the Seym Valley to the west. The low relief, gentle slopes, and mild winters make the area suitable for farming, and much of the forest has been cleared.

Chernozem soils cover around 70% of the oblast's territory; podsol soils cover 26%.

Borders

Internal: Bryansk Oblast (NW), Oryol Oblast (N), Lipetsk Oblast (NE), Voronezh Oblast (E), Belgorod Oblast (S).

International: Sumy Oblast of Ukraine (W).

Rivers
Kursk Oblast contributes to two major drainage areas: the Dnieper River and the Don River (78% and 22% respectively). Major rivers include the Seym and the Psyol.

Lakes
The inland waters of Kursk oblast consist of 145 artificial lakes and about 550 small ponds.

Natural resources

Kursk Oblast is one of Russia's major producers of iron ore. The area of the Kursk Magnetic Anomaly has one of the richest iron-ore deposits in the world. Rare earths and base metals also occur in commercial quantities in several locations. Refractory loam, mineral sands, and chalk are quarried and processed in the region. The oblast's reserves of artesian-well water are proving useful for medical purposes.

Climate
The oblast's location at the center of the European part of Russia gives the region a medium continental climate: warm summers and relatively mild winters. The average number of frost-free days ranges from 150 in the north to 160 in the south. The growing season in Kursk Oblast varies, from 180 days in the north to 195 days in the southwest. Rainfall peaks during June and July. Annual sunshine is 1775 hours.

Flora and fauna
Kursk Oblast forms a part of the Eastern European forest-steppe. One-quarter of Kursk oblast was once heavily wooded. Hardwood timbers included oak, ash, and elm.  Now forests cover only 10% of the oblast. Animals native to the area are numerous. Pike, bleak, and perch abound in local rivers. Otter and badger, as well as wild boar, red deer, and roe deer remain numerous in many parts of the area.

Administrative divisions

Demographics

Population: 

2012
Births: 13 318 (11.9 per 1000)
Deaths: 18 529 (16.6 per 1000) 

2009 - 1.53 | 2010 - 1.55 | 2011 - 1.61 | 2012 - 1.70 | 2013 - 1.67 | 2014 - 1.70 | 2015 - 1.72 | 2016 - 1.64(e)

Russians - 96.5%
Ukrainians - 1.3%
Armenians - 0.5%
Others - 1.7%
52,722 people were registered from administrative databases, and could not declare an ethnicity. It is estimated that the proportion of ethnicities in this group is the same as that of the declared group.

According to the 1897 census, there were 77.3% Russians and 22.3% Ukrainians in the Kursk Governorate. The 1932 forced end to Ukrainization in southern Russia (Soviet Republic) led to a massive decline of reported Ukrainians in these regions in the 1937 Soviet Census compared to the 1926 First All-Union Census of the Soviet Union.

The annual growth rate of the oblast's population is negative; death rate exceeds overall birth rates and immigration.

Religion

According to a 2012 survey 68.7% of the population of Kursk Oblast adheres to the Russian Orthodox Church. In addition, 24% of the population declares to be "spiritual but not religious", 4% is atheist, and 3.3% follows other religions or did not give an answer to the question.

Education

The largest universities of Kursk Oblast is Kursk State University, Kursk State Technical University, Kursk State Medical University and Kursk State Agricultural Academy which are located in the city of Kursk. There are also 19 other higher education facilities in Kursk Oblast.

History

Slavic tribes of the Severians inhabited the area. From 830 the Kursk was part of the Rus' Khaganate and Kievan Rus' states. Although territory of Kursk Oblast had been populated since the end of the last ice age, information about the cities  was scant until 1596 when the Kursk stronghold was built. Later it was part of Grand Duchy of Lithuania under the Jagiellonian dynasty. It was lost in the Muscovite–Lithuanian Wars to the Muscovite Rus'. A real growth of the area around Kursk began soon after that, with a large migration from Central Russia after famine in the beginning of the 17th century. Between 1708 and 1719, Kursk was a part of the newly created Kiev Governorate. From 1719 to 1727 it was a part of Belgorod province of Kiev Governorate.  Later Kursk uyezd was a part of Belgorod Governorate.  On 23 May 1779, Kursk Governorate was established. The latter subdivision existed until 1928, when the territory of Kursk Governorate became a part of Central Black Earth Oblast.  As Central Chernozem Oblast was very large its administration was very difficult, on 13 June 1934 it was divided into two oblasts: Kursk Oblast and Voronezh Oblast. In the period between 1934 and 1954, oblasts' borders were frequently adjusted. However, the area and borders of the oblast have remained stable from 1954.

During World War II, the territory of Kursk Oblast was occupied by the German troops from fall of 1941 until summer of 1943. The Battle of Kursk, which was one of the major battles of World War II, took place in the region between 5 July 1943 and 23 August 1943.

The territory of Kursk Oblast was the region in which the 4th leader of the USSR, Nikita Khrushchev, was born.

Politics

During the Soviet period, the high authority in the oblast was shared between three persons: The first secretary of the Kursk CPSU Committee (who in reality had the biggest authority), the chairman of the oblast Soviet (legislative power), and the Chairman of the oblast Executive Committee (executive power). In 1991, CPSU lost power, and the head of the Oblast administration, and eventually the governor was appointed/elected alongside elected regional parliament.

The Charter of Kursk Oblast is the fundamental law of the region. The Kursk Oblast Duma is the province's standing legislative (representative) body. The Legislative Assembly exercises its authority by passing laws, resolutions, and other legal acts and by supervising the implementation and observance of the laws and other legal acts passed by it. The highest executive body is the Oblast Government, which includes territorial executive bodies such as district administrations, committees, and commissions that facilitate development and run the day to day matters of the province. The Oblast administration supports the activities of the Governor who is the highest official and acts as guarantor of the observance of the oblast Charter in accordance with the Constitution of Russia.

The center-right pro-government United Russia Party and the left Communist Party of the Russian Federation are Kursk Oblast's major political parties. Traditionally, the Communist Party is the strongest in the Oblast's rural area.

Economy

Industry
The oblast's industrial production dropped rapidly during the 1990s, as an industrial crisis was stimulated by the nationwide economic crisis which followed the collapse of the Soviet Union. However, by the end of the decade output was increasing. Moreover, the manufacturing sector, despite a sagging economy in the late 20th century, continues to account for about 40% of the oblast's GDP. The engineering, electric-power, metal-working, chemicals, and food processing are the dominant industries.

Agriculture
Most of the main farming areas are used for natural pastures or cultivation, which involves mainly wheat, sugar beet, and fodder crops. The main categories of productive holdings are wheat farms, dairy farms, poultry farms, and beef cattle. Agricultural lands cover , or 77% of the oblast's territory.

Transportation
The transportation industry of Kursk Oblast, with easy access to national and international markets, is the basis for the oblast's development. The most important modes of transport throughout the oblast are by railway and road. Two major rail links pass through Kursk Oblast: Moscow–Kharkiv and Kyiv–Voronezh. Region roads serve all towns and rural settlements through  road network. In addition, there is an airport in the oblast which was opened to international flights in July 1997.

Railroads
Railroads are one of the most important component parts of the transportation system in the oblast. There is a total of sixty-five railway stations in the oblast. The density of the railroads in Kursk Oblast is one of the highest in Russia. The largest railway junctions are Kursk, Lgov, and Kastornoye. Oblast's railroads are a part of the Moscow and South Eastern Railway systems.

Tourism
Kursk Oblast's natural attraction is the Central Black Earth Nature Reserve, which offers great opportunity for hiking. Oblast's forests and others undeveloped areas are ideal for hunting, fishing, and camping. Traditional art and architecture are preserved in the town-museum of Rylsk and others historical towns of Kursk Oblast.

See also
List of Chairmen of the Kursk Oblast Duma

References

Notes

Sources

External links

Official website of Kursk Oblast
Official website of Kursk Oblast  
Kursk Region History and General Information 
 

 
States and territories established in 1934